Croatia participated at the 2017 Summer Universiade, in Taipei, Taiwan with 38 competitors in 8 sports.

Competitors
The following table lists Croatia's delegation per sport and gender.

Medal summary

Archery

Athletics

Track Events

Field Events

Diving

Gymnastics

Men
Individual

Team

Women
Team

Judo

Men

Women

Table Tennis

Taekwondo

Tennis

References

Nations at the 2017 Summer Universiade
2017
Summer U